Lorenzo Chiarinelli (16 March 1935 – 3 August 2020) was an Italian Roman Catholic prelate. He was born in Concerviano, Italy. He became a priest in 1957. He was made a bishop in 1983 by Pope John Paul II.

He was the Bishop of Sora-Cassino-Aquino-Pontecorvo from 1983 to 1993, Aversa from 1993 to 1997 and Viterbo from 1997 to 2010.

Chiarinelli died on 3 August 2020 at the age of 85.

References

1935 births
2020 deaths
Bishops of Aversa
Bishops of Viterbo
People from Lazio